Duke of Loulé is a Portuguese title of nobility created by a royal decree of King Luis I of Portugal, dated from October 3, 1862, to his grand-uncle Nuno José Severo de Mendoça Rolim de Moura Barreto, 2nd Marquis of Loulé and 9th Count of Vale de Reis. The new duke descended from earlier Portuguese monarchs and belonged to the highest nobility. After the fall of the monarchy in 1910 and the death of King Manuel II, the Duke of Loulé was acclaimed by his supporters as head of the Portuguese Royal house.

History
Duke Nuno served several times as Prime Minister of Portugal.

On December 5, 1827, Nuno of Loulé married Infanta Ana de Jesus Maria of Braganza, youngest daughter of King John VI of Portugal. She bore him five children, but died before he was elevated to ducal rank.

When the deposed King Manuel II of Portugal died in 1932, Constança Maria was the representative of the House of Loulé (4th Duchess of Loulé, if one counts all the subsequent heirs of the original duke, including those that never registered the ducal title as required by law during the monarchy).

Modern dukes and claims to the throne
 

The current representative is the infanta's great-great-great-grandson, Pedro José Folque de Mendoça Rolim de Moura Barreto. He is styled 6th Duke of Loulé in Dom Filipe Folque de Mendoça work on the "A Casa de Loulé e suas Alianças", but he is the 4th duke according to Portugal's post-monarchic titular convention, which considers the title only properly renewed in 1992 for Dom Pedro's father, the 3rd (or 5th) duke (who also registered the style of Dom, which the Loulés had not traditionally used, although entitled to do so). 

During the exile of Miguel I of Portugal and his male heirs from 1834 until 1950, Infanta Ana's descendants remained domiciled in Portugal. Therefore, the claim of the current duke to the defunct throne, as the infanta's dynastic representative, has been contrasted with that of Duarte Pio of Braganza, great-grandson and heir of Miguel I. In "As Senhoras Infantas filhas de D. João VI", published in Lisbon in 1938, Ângelo Pereira quotes, on page 161, a letter from the infanta to her brother Dom Pedro, assuming her marriage had not been authorized (although nothing in Portugal's law required a cadet infanta to obtain royal permission to marry). The Dukes of Loulé have not, in the past, pressed any claim to the throne publicly, whereas the Portuguese government and media have accorded some indications of recognition to the claimant Duarte Pio as the dynasty's royal representative since the death of the controversial claimant Maria Pia of Saxe-Coburg and Gotha Braganza in 1995. Since the Miguelist line has been disinherited by the Portuguese Cortes law of 1834, the Dukes of Loulé as being the highest legitimate senior members of the Braganza family have claimed the throne of Portugal.

Palácio do Duque de Loulé

The Palácio do Duque de Loulé (Palace of the Duke of Loulé) is a palatial villa in Cascais, on the Portuguese Riviera, famed as a notable example of Summer architecture. Built in 1870 by the 1st Duke of Loulé, today it is a luxury hotel, the Hotel Albatroz.

Family name
The dukes' family name is Mendoça Rolim de Moura Barreto.

List of dukes of Loulé 
D. Nuno José Severo de Mendoça Rolim de Moura Barreto (1804–1875)
D. Pedro José Agostinho de Mendoça Rolim de Moura Barreto (1830–1909)
D. Maria Domingas José de Mendonça Rolim de Moura Barreto (1853–1928)
D. Constança Maria da Conceição Berquó de Mendoça Rolim de Moura Barreto (1889–1965)
D. Alberto Nuno Carlos Rita Folque de Mendóça Rolim de Moura Barreto (1923–2003)
D. Pedro José Folque de Mendoça Rolim de Moura Barreto  (1958–)

Genealogical summary

See also
Count of Vale de Reis
Marquis of Loulé
List of Portuguese Dukedoms

References

External links
 Genealogy of the Dukes of Loulé, in Portuguese

 
Dukedoms of Portugal
Portuguese noble families
Loule
1862 establishments in Portugal